Williams–Ligon House, also known as Cedar Rock Plantation and Magnolia Estates, is a historic home and farm complex located Easley, Pickens County, South Carolina.  The house was built in 1895, and is a two-story, frame I-house with a one-story rear addition.  It features Folk Victorian decorative elements including spindle work and turned porch posts and balusters and brackets.  Also on the property are a contributing barn that was the original Williams house (c. 1875), a smokehouse, and several mid-20th century barns and farm buildings.

It was listed on the National Register of Historic Places in 2012.

References 

Houses on the National Register of Historic Places in South Carolina
Farms on the National Register of Historic Places in South Carolina
Victorian architecture in South Carolina
Houses completed in 1895
Houses in Pickens County, South Carolina
National Register of Historic Places in Pickens County, South Carolina
Easley, South Carolina